Fuqing (Manchu:  fucing; Died 1750) was a Manchu who began his career in the Imperial Guard, and in 1744 was sent as Resident to Tibet where he remained until the danger of a Tibetan-Dzungar alliance seemed over. The last king of Tibet would not submit to the tutelage of the Qing dynasty, and having poisoned his elder brother, proceeded to prepare for revolt. Fuqing returned with all speed and slew the king in the Chinese Residency, whither he had lured him, the result being a popular rising in which he and his staff perished. The present government system of four Kablon under the Dalai and Panchen Lamas was then established. The Resident's guard was raised to 1500 men, and all intercourse with Tibet and Dzungaria was forbidden. The Qianlong Emperor published a special decree defending the treachery of Fuqing, and ennobled his heir as Viscount. Canonised and included in the Temple of Worthies.

References

1750 deaths
Manchu politicians
Qing dynasty diplomats
Year of birth unknown
Qing dynasty politicians
Qing dynasty generals